Govia is a transport company based in the United Kingdom. It was formed in November 1996 as a joint venture between Go-Ahead Group (65%) and Keolis (35%) to bid for rail franchises during the privatisation of British Rail.

History

Established in 1986, the Go-Ahead Group has its roots in North East England where it was formed as Go-Ahead Northern during the de-regulation of the bus industry. Keolis is the biggest private operator of public transport in France and a major worldwide operator of transport services.

As part of the privatisation of British Rail, the Thames Trains franchise was awarded to Victory Rail Holdings, a company owned by Go-Ahead (65%) and some ex British Rail managers (35%), with operations commencing on 13 October 1996.  Go-Ahead bought the remaining shares it did not own in June 1998.

Go-Ahead formed a joint venture with Keolis and were awarded the Thameslink franchise with operations commencing on 2 March 1997. Upon being retendered, the franchise passed to First Capital Connect on 1 April 2006. Govia also unsuccessfully bid for the Regional Railways North West and ScotRail franchises.

In August 2001, Govia commenced operating the South Central franchise adopting the name Southern. In April 2006, Southeastern operated the South Eastern franchise. In November 2007, Govia commenced operating the London Midland franchise and in May 2014, the Govia Thameslink Railway franchise. Govia unsuccessfully bid for the Northern and TransPennine Express franchises in 2015.

Current operations
Govia currently operate one franchise:
Govia Thameslink Railway operating the Thameslink, Southern & Great Northern franchise under the Southern, Gatwick Express, Thameslink and Great Northern brands from East and West Sussex, Surrey and parts of Kent and Hampshire, along with lines from Bedford, Peterborough and Kings Lynn (via Cambridge) to London (expires April 2025).

Previous operations

Govia previously ran rail franchises through the following companies:
Thameslink from March 1997 until March 2006.
Southern operating as Southern and Gatwick Express from August 2001 and June 2008 respectively until joining Govia Thameslink Railway in July 2015.
Southeastern operated the South Eastern franchise from Kent and East Sussex to London from April 2006 until October 2021
London Midland on the West Coast Main Line and in the West Midlands from November 2007 until December 2017.

Other operations
The partners have also bid for other franchises separately. Keolis held a 45% shareholding in former train operating company First TransPennine Express since February 2004. In 2012, it bid for the InterCity West Coast franchise in partnership with SNCF. Go-Ahead bid for the Greater Anglia franchise.

The partners also lodged an unsuccessful bid for the TransPennine Express franchise in 2015, but this was not being done through Govia, with Keolis holding a majority shareholding.

References

External links
Company website

Go-Ahead Group companies
Keolis
1996 establishments in England